What a Carve Up! is a 1961 British comedy-horror film directed by Pat Jackson and starring Sid James, Kenneth Connor, and Shirley Eaton. It was released in the United States in 1962 as No Place Like Homicide.
The film was loosely based on the 1928 novel The Ghoul by Frank King. A previous version, titled The Ghoul, was filmed in 1933 by Gaumont-British Pictures.

Plot
The relatives of Gabriel Broughton are summoned to Blackshaw Towers, an old, isolated country house in the middle of moorlands in Yorkshire, to hear the reading of his will. Gabriel's nervous nephew Ernest Broughton brings along his flatmate Syd Butler for support. At the large, gloomy mansion, they meet Guy Broughton, Ernest's cousin; Malcolm Broughton, a piano player who claims everyone is "quite mad"; Janet Broughton and Dr Edward Broughton, Guy's sister and father, respectively; Emily Broughton, a dotty old woman who believes the First World War is still on; and Linda Dixon, Gabriel's nurse. To their surprise, the solicitor Everett Sloane reveals that they have all inherited nothing, except for Linda, who is bequeathed Gabriel's medicines and syringe, much to her amusement.

The lights go out, and Ernest and Syd accompany Fisk, the butler, outside to try to effect repairs. They are unsuccessful, but on the way back, they find the body of Dr. Broughton. Syd states it was murder, but when he tries to telephone the police, he discovers the wire has been cut. With everyone stranded for the night, Sloane recommends they all lock themselves in their rooms. Ernest gets lost and enters Linda's room by mistake. She proposes that he stay the night with her, but he beats a hasty retreat and persuades the imperturbable Syd to share his room.

When Ernest goes to use the toilet, someone tries to stab the sleeping Syd, then desists when he speaks up. Ernest starts playing "Chopsticks" on the organ. Malcolm joins him in a duet, but is stabbed in the back. Ernest's screams bring the others, and Sloane observes that the room was locked from the inside, so the solicitor recommends locking him in. Syd stays with Ernest, certain he is not the killer. They discover a secret passage, uncovering the means by which the murderer was able to leave the locked room. The survivors decide to remain together in the lounge for safety, but Janet is struck by a poison dart shot from behind a painting on the wall. They suspect Fisk, who was not present, but he has an airtight alibi. Sloane decides on his own to go to the village and fetch the police. When the others return to the room, Emily, who remained behind, insists she spoke to Gabriel. Syd and Guy check the coffin, but Gabriel's body is there. Then Ernest claims he also saw Gabriel. He finds another secret passage that leads to the now empty coffin, and then Guy also disappears, along with a small pistol he had in his possession.

Finally Police Inspector Arkwright arrives. He is sceptical that murders have been committed, especially since there are no bodies, but then Guy's is found. When Ernest goes to fetch Syd, they find the dead Sloane in a fountain outside, proving he could not have sent the policeman. However, the inspector - Gabriel in disguise - still manages to take them all prisoner with Guy's pistol. He explains his motive, that his relatives sponged off of him for years and treated him badly. He then locks up Syd, Ernest, Emily and Linda and sets starving dogs on them, but when he tries to shoot Fisk whilst fleeing, he misses and triggers a lethal trap instead, which drops a chandelier on him. The dogs, it turns out, were fed by Fisk, so they constitute no danger. The next day, to Ernest's disappointment, Linda's boyfriend (played by uncredited Adam Faith) comes to collect her.

Cast 
The cast includes some of the famous faces from the Carry On series.
Sid James as Syd Butler, a bookmaker who acts as Ernest's legal advisor
Kenneth Connor as Ernest Broughton, a proofreader and nephew of the deceased
Shirley Eaton as Linda Dixon, a pretty nurse who likes Ernie 
Dennis Price as Guy Broughton, Ernie's cousin, an ex-officer and a heavy drinker
Donald Pleasence as Everett Sloane, a solicitor
Michael Gough as Fisk, the Butler
Esma Cannon as Emily Broughton, the aunt of Ernest, Guy and Janet
Valerie Taylor as Janet Broughton, Guy's grasping sister
Michael Gwynn as Malcolm Broughton
George Woodbridge as Dr Edward Broughton, the brother of Gabriel and father of Janet and Guy
Philip O'Flynn as Gabriel Broughton and Arkwright, the Police Inspector
Frederick Piper as the Hearse Driver
Timothy Bateson as the Porter
Adam Faith in an uncredited role as himself

Reception
"At one point in No Place Like Homicide, a giggling maniac threatens to feed the rest of the cast to a pack of starving mongrels. 'Oh, blimey', smirks one of the victims, 'we're going to the dogs'. The rest of the humour in this ostensible British farce is on a similar level. The fact that a film of this degree of vulgarity and ineptitude should have managed a week's booking at neighbourhood theatres throughout Manhattan demonstrates just how acute the motion picture product shortage really is." - New York Times, 13 September 1962.

In his book Comedy-Horror Films: A Chronological History, 1914-2008, Bruce G. Hallenbeck called What a Carve Up! "one of the better horror spoofs of the decade", citing its mixture of Carry On-style comedy and haunted house plot, charming period tone, and "creepy atmosphere that ranks with some of the best serious horror films."

The film was used extensively within Jonathan Coe's satirical novel What a Carve Up! The book's protagonist, Michael Owen, becomes obsessed with the film after first watching it as a young boy. Additionally, the last part of the book follows the plot of the film.

DVD release
What a Carve Up! was released on DVD in the U.K. on 11 August 2008.

References

External links

1961 films
1961 horror films
1960s comedy horror films
1960s comedy mystery films
British black-and-white films
British comedy horror films
Films based on British novels
Films directed by Pat Jackson
Films set in country houses
Films set in Yorkshire
1961 comedy films
1960s English-language films
1960s British films